Kajetan Tomasz Broniewski (born 6 March 1963 in Zabrze) is a Polish rower.

References 
 
 

1963 births
Living people
Polish male rowers
Olympic rowers of Poland
Rowers at the 1988 Summer Olympics
Rowers at the 1992 Summer Olympics
Rowers at the 1996 Summer Olympics
Olympic bronze medalists for Poland
Olympic medalists in rowing
Sportspeople from Zabrze
World Rowing Championships medalists for Poland
Medalists at the 1992 Summer Olympics